Clitoriopsis is a genus of flowering plants in the legume family, Fabaceae. It belongs to the subfamily Faboideae. There is only one species in the genus : Clitoriopsis mollis R.Wilczek.

References 

Phaseoleae
Fabaceae genera